The 2020–21 2. Frauen-Bundesliga was the 17th season of Germany's second-tier women's football league. The season began on 4 October 2020 and concluded on 6 June 2021. The champions of both divisions were promoted to the Frauen-Bundesliga, while the bottom three teams were relegated to the Frauen-Regionalliga.

This season initially consisted of 19 teams, as there was no relegation from the previous season, due to the COVID-19 pandemic in Germany. USV Jena joined forces with FC Carl Zeiss Jena and competed under their name. In a conference with the clubs, two systems were put to a vote. The majority of the clubs decided on one option, which is to re-divide the league into Nord and Süd. To get back to the desired strength of 14 teams and a single-league, there were six relegated teams: the last three in the ten-team division and last two teams from the nine-team division. The last team was determined between the teams who finished seventh in each division. Before the season, BV Cloppenburg withdrew its women's team from the 2. Bundesliga after bankruptcy and was thus relegated, reducing the league to 18 teams. On 3 November 2020, the league was paused. In late February 2021, it was announced that the season would continue on 21 March.

The fixtures were announced on 4 August 2020.

Effects of the COVID-19 pandemic
On 31 August 2020, the DFB Executive Committee decided to allow for the use of five substitutions in matches during the 2020–21 season, which was implemented in other DFB competitions at the end of the previous season to lessen the impact of fixture congestion caused by the COVID-19 pandemic. The use of five substitutes, based on the decision of competition organisers, had been extended by IFAB until 2021.

Teams

Team changes

North

Stadiums

League table

Results

Top scorers

South

Stadiums

League table

Results

Top scorers

Relegation play-offs
The relegation play-offs took place on 30 May and 6 June 2021.

Overview

|}

Matches

1899 Hoffenheim II won 3–1 on aggregate.

Notes

References

External links

2020-21
2020–21 in German women's football leagues